Out of Left Field is the forty-fifth studio album by American musician Hank Williams Jr. It was released by Curb/Capricorn Records on March 9, 1993. "Everything Comes Down to Money and Love" and "Diamond Mine" were released as singles. The album peaked at number 25 on the Billboard Top Country Albums chart.

Track listing
"Everything Comes Down to Money and Love" (Dave Loggins, Gove Scrivenor) – 3:31
"Diamond Mine" (Michael Bornheim, Gerry House, Devon O'Day) – 3:21
"Blue Lady in a Red Mercedes" (Buck Moore, Troy Seals, Dan Toler) – 2:53
"Both Sides of Goodbye" (Jackson Leap, Kim Williams) – 3:26
"Warm in Dallas" (Hank Williams Jr.) – 3:16
"Out of Left Field" (Spooner Oldham, Dan Penn) – 3:49
"Hide and Seek" (Hank Williams Jr.) – 3:25
"Hold What You've Got" (Joe Tex) – 3:37
"I'm Tired" (Jack Daniels, Nesbett Lashburn, Dink Suggins, Paul Worley) – 3:17
"Dirty Mind" (Hank Williams Jr.) – 3:33

Personnel
 Eddie Bayers - drums, snare drums
 Barry Beckett - keyboards
 Gary Burr - background vocals
 Vicki Hampton - background vocals
 Yvonne Hodges - background vocals
 Dann Huff - baritone guitar, electric guitar
 John Barlow Jarvis - keyboards 
 Chris Leuzinger - baritone guitar, electric guitar
 "Cowboy" Eddie Long - steel guitar
 Donna McElroy - background vocals
 Carl Marsh - Fairlight
 Phil Naish - keyboards
 Don Potter - acoustic guitar
 Michael Rhodes - bass guitar
 Tom Roady - percussion
 Brent Rowan - baritone guitar, electric guitar
 Harry Stinson - background vocals
 Hank Williams Jr. - acoustic guitar, lead vocals
 Dennis Wilson - background vocals
 Curtis Young - background vocals
 Reggie Young - baritone guitar, electric guitar

Chart performance

References

1993 albums
Hank Williams Jr. albums
Curb Records albums
Capricorn Records albums
Albums produced by Barry Beckett
Albums produced by James Stroud